Dinemagonum is a genus of flowering plants belonging to the family Malpighiaceae.

Its native range is Chile.

Species:
 Dinemagonum gayanum A.Juss.

References

Malpighiaceae
Malpighiaceae genera